The British National Squash Championships are the national squash championships for players from the United Kingdom & Ireland. They are held annually in early February, currently in Nottingham.

The Championships were inaugurated in 1974 are not to be confused with the British Open Squash Championships which is open to all nationalities and is the oldest squash tournament. The championships also involve masters events for British squash players in different age groups. The categories for men are:-  Over 35, Over 40, Over 45, Over 50, Over 55, Over 60, Over 65, Over 70 and Over 75. The categories for women are:- Over 35, Over 40, Over 45, Over 50 and Over 55.

History
The first championships were held for men in 1974, with the women's tournament added the following year. Initially held in December of each year, the championships were moved to January/February in 1991.

Many leading male players boycotted the 1993 tournament in protest over a range of issues, including the amount of prize money on offer and the Squash Rackets Association's selection criteria for the England team. 

In 2004, Cassie Campion (during her final competitive year) surpassed Sue Cogswell's record by winning her sixth title. This remains as the women's record today. The men's Over 70 event was added in 2005 and the men's Over 75 event was added in 2011.

The 2012 men's final was contested between the reigning World Champion and World No.1, Nick Matthew, and the reigning World No.2, James Willstrop. Matthew won 3–1 to claim his fourth British National title and equal the record set by Phil Kenyon. During the year that Matthew retired (2018) he extended the record to ten titles.

Venues
The championships were held at the National Squash Centre at Sportscity in Manchester from 2003 to 2018.

The women's tournament began in 1975 and was initially hosted at Edgbaston Priory Club in Birmingham, before moving on to Dallington, Northamptonshire (1976–77), Carriages in Hellingly, East Sussex (1978), Chichester, West Sussex (1979) and Wembley Squash Centre (1980–82). From 1983 the women's and men's championships were held in the same location.

Past results

Men's finals

Women's finals

References

External links 
Official National Squash Championships website
 Official England Squash & Racketball website
 List of British National Squash Championship past winners – Men
 List of British National Squash Championship past winners  – Women
 List of British National Championship Masters winners 
 List of British Junior National Squash Championship past winners  – Men
 List of British Junior National Squash Championship past winners – Women

Squash tournaments in the United Kingdom
United Kingdom sport-related lists
2003 establishments in the United Kingdom
Recurring sporting events established in 2003
Sport in Manchester